Robbie Robertson is the solo debut album by Canadian rock musician Robbie Robertson, released in 1987. Though Robertson has been a professional musician since the late 1950s, notably a founder of and primary songwriter for The Band, this was his first proper solo album. Robbie Robertson won the Juno Award for "Album of the Year", and producers Daniel Lanois and Robertson won the "Producer of the Year" Juno award, both in 1989; there were no Juno Awards in 1988.

The album includes contributions from Rick Danko and Garth Hudson of The Band, as well as U2 and Peter Gabriel, both of whom had worked with Lanois. U2 was recording The Joshua Tree concurrent to the early stages of this album, and Gabriel had recorded So the previous year. U2's contributions are heard in the song "Sweet Fire of Love", a duet of sorts between Robertson and U2 lead singer Bono, and in "Testimony" again featuring backing by U2. Gabriel's contributions are heard on the song "Fallen Angel", which was dedicated to Richard Manuel, Robertson's former bandmate in the Band, and "Broken Arrow", which reverberates with Gabriel's signature Yamaha CP-80 electric piano. In addition, Tony Levin and Manu Katché, who were recording with Gabriel, are featured prominently on this record.

In 2005 the album was reissued together with its follow-up, Storyville, as two-CD set, in an expanded edition, both with two bonus tracks.

Production
After a lengthy sabbatical, Robertson announced via a 1983 article in Billboard magazine that he was returning and available to work on projects. Film producer Art Linson encouraged Robertson to focus on creating a solo record when the two vacationed together in Rome that same year. Robertson then began conceptualizing the idea, starting with creating a setting called "The Shadowland" where the songs in the album would take place. Robertson imagined The Shadowland to be a mythical place "that moves around according to [the] clouds that cover [it]", and imagined himself to be a wanderer who would narrate the events that would take place in this mythical locale.

Robertson was signed to EMI Records by then head of A&R and longtime The Band fan Gary Gersh. Preliminary discussions and preproduction for Robertson's first solo album began in autumn 1984. Gersh then moved to Geffen Records, and convinced the label to buy out Robertson's contract with EMI.

The first producer Robertson considered for production of the album was fellow Canadian Daniel Lanois. After meeting up with several more potential producers, Robertson decided to work with Lanois because of their shared interest in experimentation. After Lanois finished a stage of the production work with U2 on what would become their album The Joshua Tree, Robertson let Lanois know that he was ready to begin work on the album. The two began production and recording in July 1986.

Robertson kept an office on the property of the recording studio The Village Recorder in West Los Angeles, California, where he would work out ideas for the album. Much of the album was recorded there. Robertson's basic backing band included guitar player Bill Dillon, a friend of Lanois' who had also played for Ronnie Hawkins, as well as bass player Tony Levin, and Parisian drummer Manu Katché. Robertson brought in drummer Terry Bozzio after Katché had to return to Paris. Robertson also brought in The BoDeans to provide group vocals for some of the tracks on the album, most notably on "Showdown at Big Sky". BoDeans member Sam Llanas created a faux female voice that was used on the chorus of "Somewhere Down the Crazy River". The Band members Garth Hudson and Rick Danko also appear on the album, as do Ivan Neville (son of R&B singer Aaron Neville) and jazz bassist Larry Klein.

Lanois broke away from the album's production to continue working with U2 in August 1986, while Robertson worked with director Martin Scorsese on creating and composing the score for the film The Color of Money (1986). While Lanois was working with U2, he invited Robertson to come out to Ireland to work in the home studio where U2 were recording. Robertson flew to Ireland in late August 1986, arriving in the aftermath of Hurricane Charley. Robertson had just finished work on The Color of Money, and arrived with nothing prepared except for a Gil Evans horn chart left over from The Color of Money and a recording he had made of a guitar riff accompanied by a tom tom drum. Robertson fleshed out some lyrical ideas inspired by the hurricane and the turbulent flight over, while Lanois worked with the members of U2 on extracting a musical concept from the guitar riff Robertson had presented to them. Robertson and U2 lead singer Bono then improvised a set of lyrics in the studio while the band's instrumentalists played behind them, creating a 22-minute track that was edited into the song "Sweet Fire of Love". Lanois then used the Gil Evans horn arrangements as the basis of another track entitled "Testimony", which also featured the members of U2.

Robertson then flew to Bath, England to work with Peter Gabriel in his home studio. Robertson had been devising a track entitled "Fallen Angel" about a soul passing into the next dimension. Robertson attributed the direction he was taking to the recent passing of fellow Band alumnus Richard Manuel, who had committed suicide in a hotel room in Florida in March 1986, and dedicated the song to him. Robertson loved the "ghosty, angelic sound" Gabriel achieved when stacking his vocals, and requested that Gabriel record background vocals for the song, which he agreed to. Gabriel also provided keyboards on "Fallen Angel", as well as keyboards and drum programming on "Broken Arrow", a song which was inspired by Robertson's Native American heritage.

Robertson also recorded at Bearsville Studios near Woodstock, New York, which was founded by his former manager Albert Grossman. At Bearsville Studios, Robertson worked on a version of "What About Now" that was withheld from the final release of the album, as well the track "American Roulette," which was inspired by a screenplay he had written. Robertson utilized Lone Justice lead singer Maria McKee as backing vocalist for these two tracks. Engineer Bob Clearmountain was brought in to remix the album just before its release.

Reception
Released on October 26, 1987, Robbie Robertson peaked at #35 on the Billboard 200, remaining in the Top 40 for 3 weeks. Robbie Robertson produced several hits on the Billboard Mainstream Rock charts, with "Showdown At Big Sky" coming in the highest (#2) and "Sweet Fire Of Love" the second highest (#7). The album was nominated for a Grammy Award for "Best Rock / Vocal Album". Robbie Robertson was certified gold in the United States in 1991.

Robbie Robertson was critically well-received at the time of its release, placing at #13 in the annual Pazz & Jop Critics Poll published in The Village Voice. The album was listed in the Top Ten Albums Of The Year by several of the critics in Billboard magazine's 1987 "The Critics' Choice" end of the year feature, and in February 1988, the album was listed in Stereo Review magazine's "Best Recordings of The Month" feature. In 1989, the album was listed as #77 in Rolling Stone'''s "100 Best Albums of the Eighties."

The album did receive negative criticism as well, with Greil Marcus later deriding it as "draped in curtains of overproduction" with "themes so elaborated and vocals so disguised it was hard to discern an actual human being behind any of it." Robert Christgau wrote that it "took some guts for such an unrepentant Americana-monger [like Robertson] to risk Anglophobe wrath" by collaborating with Lanois and Bono, but he was very disappointed with the results and graded the album with a C+. 

Barney Hoskyns dismissed it as sounding "bloated and grandiose," with Robertson "overreaching himself and getting lost in flights of airy verbosity." Elvis Costello, a lifelong fan of The Band, said he "didn't like it at all," and that "it was like [Robertson] decided to make a Peter Gabriel album, whereas his songwriting was much more interesting and enigmatic when he was working on that smaller scale. It's almost like the best songs on the record are the ones that operate on that scale but have then been artificially inflated with steroids to become this widescreen Peter Gabriel music."

Songwriting
"Broken Arrow"
Rod Stewart recorded a version of "Broken Arrow" in 1991 for his album Vagabond Heart. Stewart's version of the song was released as a single on August 26, 1991, with an accompanying music video, reaching number 20 on the US Billboard Hot 100 chart and number two in Canada.

"Broken Arrow" was also performed live by the Grateful Dead from 1993 to 1995 with Phil Lesh on vocals. Grateful Dead spinoff groups The Dead, Phil Lesh and Friends, and The Other Ones have also performed the song, each time with Lesh on vocals.

This ballad is not to be confused either with Chuck Berry's 1959 single or Buffalo Springfield's 1967 song of the same name, written by Neil Young.

"American Roulette"
The lyrics of "American Roulette" deal with the theme of the rise to fame of three iconic Americans (James Dean in the first verse, Elvis Presley in the second verse, and Marilyn Monroe in the third verse) and its consequences for them personally. They are not mentioned by name but are described in idealistic terms rather than strictly biographical form. Musically, the song is notable for its guitar solo throughout as well as the instrumental conclusion.

"Somewhere Down the Crazy River"
When asked about the inspiration for album's single "Somewhere Down the Crazy River", Lanois commented, "Robbie Robertson was describing what it was like to hang out in Arkansas with Levon Helm in his old neighbourhood. He was telling me about the hot nights and fishing with dynamite, and was asking someone for directions for someplace somewhere down the crazy river''. ... I had presented him with this instrument that [Brian] Eno introduced me to called the Suzuki Omnichord, like an electric autoharp. He found a little chord sequence with it that was sweet and wonderful. As he was developing his chord sequence I recorded him and superimposed his storytelling, which I was secretly recording, on top. That was the birth of  'Somewhere Down The Crazy River.' It's kind of like a guy with a deep voice telling you about steaming nights in Arkansas." This song is notable as Robertson's only solo hit in the UK, reaching number 15 on the UK singles chart. His follow-up single there, "Fallen Angel" (also from the album), reached number 95.

"Showdown at Big Sky"
Sam Llanas, from the BoDeans, provided the distinctive background vocals on this song, The BoDeans' Kurt Neumann and Llanas contributed backing vocals to "Somewhere Down the Crazy River" and "American Roulette". Because of the popularity of the BoDeans in their home state of Wisconsin, "Showdown at Big Sky" received significant airplay on Milwaukee AOR radio.

"Fallen Angel"
"Fallen Angel" is lyrically about Robertson's former bandmate Richard Manuel, who took his own life in 1986. Peter Gabriel sings with Robertson on this track.  It also features contributions from another former Band member Garth Hudson.

Track listing
All songs written by Robbie Robertson except where noted.

 "Fallen Angel" (Robertson, Martin Page) – 5:52
 "Showdown at Big Sky" – 4:43
 "Broken Arrow" – 5:17
 "Sweet Fire of Love" (Robertson, U2) – 5:08
 "American Roulette" – 4:46
 "Somewhere Down the Crazy River" – 4:44
 "Hell's Half Acre" – 3:45
 "Sonny Got Caught in the Moonlight" – 3:45
 "Testimony" – 4:45
Bonus tracks on the 2005 expanded edition:
 "Christmas Must Be Tonight" – 4:51, from the soundtrack album Scrooged (1988)
 "Testimony" (edited 12" remix) – 6:34, with additional production and remix by Nile Rodgers

Personnel
 Robbie Robertson – vocals, backing vocals, guitar, keyboards
 Bill Dillon – guitars on tracks 1, 2, and 5–9; backing vocal on track 2
 Tony Levin – Chapman Stick on tracks 5 & 7; bass on tracks 6 & 8
 Manu Katché – drums on tracks 1, 2, 6, 7, and 8; percussion on tracks 1, 7, and 8
 Daniel Lanois – percussion on tracks 2, 3, 4, and 8; backing vocal on tracks 2, 3, and 4; Omnichord on track 5; guitar on tracks 5 and 8

Additional personnel

 Eluriel "Tinker" Barfield – bass on tracks 1 and 5
 Garth Hudson – keyboards on tracks 1 and 5
 Peter Gabriel – keyboards on tracks 1 and 3; vocals on track 1; drum program on track 3; vocal cameo on track 9
 Martin Page – drum programming on track 1
 Larry Klein – bass on track 2
 Abraham Laboriel – bass on track 3
 Terry Bozzio – drums on tracks 3 and 5
 Bono – vocals, bass on track 4; backing vocal and guitar on track 9
 The Edge – guitar on tracks 4 and 9
 Adam Clayton – bass on tracks 4 and 9
 Larry Mullen, Jr. – drums on tracks 4 and 9
 Hans Christian – bass guitar on track 5
 BoDeans (Sam Llanas, Kurt Neumann) – backing vocals on tracks 2 and 5
 Maria McKee – backing vocal on track 5
 Sammy BoDean (Sam Llanas) – backing vocal on track 6
 Cary Butler – backing vocal on track 8
 Rick Danko – backing vocal on track 8
 Ivan Neville – backing vocal on track 9
 Gil Evans Horn Section – horns on track 9

note: the album credits erroneously credited Ashcombe House to being in London. Its correct location is Somerset.

Charts

Weekly charts

Year-end charts

Single

Certifications

References

External links 
 Review from Rolling Stone

1987 debut albums
Robbie Robertson albums
Albums produced by Daniel Lanois
Albums produced by Robbie Robertson
Geffen Records albums
Juno Award for Album of the Year albums